Lower Prussia is a historical region in the eastern Prussia. On the north it borders the norther Sambia Peninsula via the Pregolya river, on the east, the Łyna river, forming boundary with Lithuania Minor. On the south it borders Warmia, and Masuria. In modern times, it is divided between Kaliningrad Oblast, Russia, and Warmian-Masurian Voivodeship, Poland.

Citations

Notes

References 

Geography of Prussia
Historical regions in Russia
Historical regions in Poland
Geography of Kaliningrad Oblast
Geography of Warmian-Masurian Voivodeship